Ahmet Berman (1 January 1932 - 17 December 1980) was a Turkish footballer who played for Turkey in the 1954 FIFA World Cup. He also played for Beşiktaş and Galatasaray.

He died on December 17, 1980, and was laid to rest at the Feriköy Cemetery, Istanbul.

Individual
Beşiktaş J.K. Squads of Century (Bronze Team)

References

External links
 
 

1932 births
People from Fatih
Footballers from Istanbul
Turkish footballers
Turkey international footballers
Association football defenders
Beşiktaş J.K. footballers
Vefa S.K. footballers
1954 FIFA World Cup players
1980 deaths
Burials at Feriköy Cemetery